Prasonica is a genus of orb-weaver spiders first described by Eugène Simon in 1895.

Species
 it contains ten species:
Prasonica affinis Strand, 1906 – Algeria
Prasonica albolimbata Simon, 1895 (type) – Congo, Madagascar, Yemen
Prasonica anarillea Roberts, 1983 – Seychelles (Aldabra)
Prasonica hamata Thorell, 1899 – Cameroon
Prasonica insolens (Simon, 1909) – India, Vietnam, Java
Prasonica nigrotaeniata (Simon, 1909) – West, Central, East Africa
Prasonica olivacea Strand, 1906 – Ethiopia
Prasonica opaciceps (Simon, 1895) – New Guinea
Prasonica plagiata (Dalmas, 1917) – New Zealand
Prasonica seriata Simon, 1895 – Africa, Madagascar, Seychelles

References

Araneidae
Araneomorphae genera
Spiders of Africa
Spiders of Asia
Spiders of New Zealand
Taxa named by Eugène Simon